Fred Fox may refer to:

Fred Fox (director) (1884–1949), English assistant director and film actor
Fred Fox (musician) (1914–2019), American French horn player and educator
Fred L. Fox (1876–1952), Justice of the Supreme Court of Appeals of West Virginia

See also
Freddie Fox (disambiguation)
Frederick Fox (disambiguation)
Cyril Fred Fox (1882–1967), English archaeologist